Norman and Beard were a pipe organ manufacturer based in Norwich from 1887 to 1916.

History

The origins of the company are from a business founded in Diss in 1870 by Ernest William Norman (1851–1927). In 1876 he moved to Norwich where he went into partnership with his brother, Herbert John Norman (1861–1936). In 1887 they went into partnership with George A. Wales Beard, and the company was formed. In 1896 the company opened a second office in London.

They worked closely with Robert Hope-Jones and held the patents on many of his developments, including electro-pneumatic action.

The company merged with William Hill & Sons of London in 1916, and became William Hill & Son & Norman & Beard Ltd.

Organs
St. John's Church, Bangalore 1895
Norwich Cathedral 1899 (NPOR N06483)
Llandaff Cathedral 1900 (NPOR N11801)
Duke's Hall, Royal Academy of Music 1900  (NPOR D07229)
St Mary's Church, Oldswinford 1901  (NPOR N03681)
Our Lady Star of the Sea Church, Lowestoft 1902 (wind blown, three manual organ of 1,152 pipes, still in a pristine extant condition) 
Nairn Old Parish Church, Nairn 1903 (NPOR R00423)
Leeds Cathedral 1904
Cheltenham College 1905 (NPOR N07470)
St Stephen's, Gloucester Road 1905
St. Michael's Church, Tilehurst, Berkshire 1905
Town Hall, Wellington New Zealand 1906
St. Mary the Virgin, Nonington, Kent 1906 (NPOR D04898)
Parish Church of Kilmun, Argyll & Bute, 1906 (water-powered)
Town Hall, Auckland, New Zealand 1907-1912
Bethlehem Welsh Independent Chapel, Rhosllanerchrugog, 1908
All Saints' Church, Yelvertoft, Northamptonshire. 1908
Great Hall, University of Birmingham 1908 (NPOR N07270)
Winchester College Chapel 1908 (NPOR D01086)
Emmanuel College, Cambridge 1909 (NPOR N05206)
All Saints' Church, Binfield, Berkshire. 1910 (NPOR D01111)
St Mary the Virgin, South Elmsall, West Yorkshire. 1910 (NPOR K01511)
St. Chads, Shrewsbury, Shropshire 1904
St. Michael's Church, Aylsham, Norfolk, 1911
St. Michael & All Angels Church, Wilmington, Kent 1912 (NPOR N08477)
 The Andaz, Temple 1912 (London)
St.Stephen's Church, Cheltenham. 1912
St Mary's Parish Church, Slough, Berkshire 1912
St Mary's Church, Baldock 1913
St Mary's Church, Reigate, Surrey, UK. 1911 
Walhampton School Chapel, Lymington, Hampshire, 1913
Usher Hall, Edinburgh 1914 (NPOR D07910)
St John the Evangelist, Bierley, Bradford 1916 (NPOR N02678)
Town Hall, Johannesburg 1916
Sherborne School Chapel, Sherborne, Dorset. 1926
St John's Cathedral Brisbane Australia
Trinity Methodist Church, Felixstowe, Suffolk, UK. 1906.
Calvert Methodist Church, Hastings, Sussex, UK
City Hall, Cape Town, South Africa 
United Church, Rondebosch, Cape Town, South Africa
Bethesda Chapel, Llanwrtyd Wells, Wales .1906
Troqueer Parish Church, Dumfries 
 St. Christopher' Anglican Church, West Vancouver, B.C. Canada. 1963
 St. Mary's Scottish Episcopal Church, Glencoe, Highland. 1916
NG Church Wakkerstroom, Mpumalanga South Africa 1912
St Michael's Church, Beaulieu sur mer, France 1903
Lycée Saint-Vincent Providence de Rennes Chapel, Rennes, 1896

References

Pipe organ building companies
Organ builders of the United Kingdom
Manufacturing companies established in 1887
Musical instrument manufacturing companies of the United Kingdom
Manufacturing companies disestablished in 1916
1916 disestablishments in England
1916 mergers and acquisitions
British companies disestablished in 1916
British companies established in 1887
Companies based in Norwich